Loje is small settlement in the hills north of Kneža in the Municipality of Tolmin in the Littoral region of Slovenia.

The local church is dedicated to Saints Peter and Paul and belongs to the Parish of Podmelec.

References

External links
Loje on Geopedia

Populated places in the Municipality of Tolmin